Homalanthus populifolius, the bleeding heart, native poplar or Queensland poplar, is an Australian rainforest plant in the family Euphorbiaceae. It often appears in areas of rainforest disturbance. Bleeding heart is highly regarded by rainforest regenerators because of its fast growth and use as a pioneer species in rainforest regeneration.

Bleeding heart grows from the coastal border of New South Wales and Victoria (36° S), north to Coen, Queensland (13° S) in the tropics. It is also native to Lord Howe Island, Norfolk Island, Papua New Guinea and Solomon Islands, and has been widely planted elsewhere.

It is the host plant for Australia's largest moth, the Hercules moth (Coscinocera hercules).

Description
It is a small tree or shrub, up to 8 meters tall and 15 cm in diameter.

The trunk is cylindrical with greyish-brown bark, fairly smooth but with some bumps and irregularities. Branchlets appear thick, reddish or green. The leaves are triangular, not toothed and alternate, 5 to 15 cm long, and like those of a poplar (giving rise to the species epithet populifolius). The leaves turn red when senescent, hence the common name of bleeding heart.

Flowers are yellow green to red, 2 to 10 cm long. Appearing on racemes mostly in the months of September to December. The fruit matures from December to March, being a two-lobed capsule with an oily yellow aril. The seeds germinate quickly when the warmth of direct sunlight is available. However, as with many pioneer species, the seeds of the bleeding heart have a long dormancy period.

The fruit is eaten by a variety of birds, including brown cuckoo dove, silvereye and Lewin's honeyeater.

Uses
The small size and decorative red leaves make this an attractive garden plant. However, its characteristics as a pioneer species also make it a good invader in disturbed areas.  It is regarded as an invasive species in southern Africa, Hawaii and New Zealand. The Sa’dan Toraja people crush the leaves with mud to create a black dye for funeral clothing

Image gallery

References
 Floyd, A.G., Rainforest Trees of Mainland South-eastern Australia, Inkata Press 1989, 

Hippomaneae
Malpighiales of Australia
Ornamental trees
Trees of Australia
Flora of New South Wales
Flora of Queensland
Flora of Norfolk Island
Flora of Lord Howe Island
Flora of the Solomon Islands (archipelago)
Flora of New Guinea